Wizards of the Demon Sword is a 1991 film directed by Fred Olen Ray and starring Russ Tamblyn.

Premise
Ulric's (Russ Tamblyn) daughter unites with warrior Thane (Blake Bahner) against evil Lord Khoura (Lyle Waggoner), who covets the knife of Aktar.

Cast
Lyle Waggoner as Lord Khoura
Russ Tamblyn as Ulric
Blake Bahner as Thane
Heidi Paine as Malina
Jay Richardson as Omar
Dawn Wildsmith as Selena
Dan Speaker as Damon
Hoke Howell as Seer Of Roebuck
Dan Golden as Gorgon
Lawrence Tierney as Slave Master
Michael Berryman
Jim Mitchum

Production
Fred Olen Ray says the film has its genesis with sets left over from Roger Corman's The Masque of the Red Death. The sets were going to be torn down so Ray decided to use them for a film. A script was written, actors hired (including Russ Tamblyn) and Ray shot two days of a sword and sorcery film, Wizards of the Demon Sword. He then planned filming the rest of the film.  They only needed four days, and had five days use left of the camera equipment. Ray decided to make another movie Bad Girls from Mars.

Dan Golden rewrote a script from another writer.

Reception
According to Ray, Demon Sword "tanked financially" in part because the film wound up at Troma who "ripped him off".

References

External links

Wizards of the Demon Sword at Letterbox DVD
Wizards of the Demon Sword at TCMDB

Films directed by Fred Olen Ray
1991 films
1991 fantasy films
American sword and sorcery films
American fantasy films
American exploitation films
1990s English-language films
1990s American films